is a 2005 action role-playing game developed and published by Square Enix in collaboration with Buena Vista Games for the PlayStation 2 video game console. The game is a sequel to Kingdom Hearts, and like the original game, combines characters and settings from Disney films with those of Square Enix's Final Fantasy series. An expanded re-release of the game featuring new and additional content, Kingdom Hearts II Final Mix, was released exclusively in Japan in March 2007. The Final Mix version of the game was later remastered in high definition and released globally as a part of the Kingdom Hearts HD 2.5 Remix collection for the PlayStation 3, PlayStation 4, Xbox One, Windows, and Nintendo Switch.

Kingdom Hearts II is the third game in the Kingdom Hearts series. It picks up one year after the events of Kingdom Hearts: Chain of Memories. Sora, the protagonist of the first two games, returns to search for his lost friends while battling the sinister Organization XIII, a group of antagonists previously introduced in Chain of Memories. Like the previous games, Kingdom Hearts II features a large cast of characters from Disney and Square Enix properties.

Concepts for Kingdom Hearts II began during the end of development of Kingdom Hearts Final Mix, with the game entering full development in 2003 and being announced at Tokyo Game Show 2003. Most of the first game's development team returned, including director Tetsuya Nomura, with the game being developed concurrently with Chain of Memories. In developing Kingdom Hearts II, the development team sought to address user feedback from the first game, give the player more freedom and options in combat and present a deeper and more mature plot.

The game received critical acclaim, as it earned several awards upon release, receiving critical praise for its story, gameplay, characters, graphical improvements, and has since been cited as one of the greatest video games of all time. In both Japan and North America, it shipped more than one million copies within weeks of its release, with over four million worldwide by April 2007.

Gameplay

The gameplay of Kingdom Hearts II is similar to the action RPG and hack and slash gameplay of the first Kingdom Hearts game, though developers made an effort to address some of the complaints  of no map and camera bugs with the previous game. The player directly controls Sora from a third-person camera angle, though first-person perspective is available via Select button. Most of the gameplay occurs on interconnected field maps where battles take place. The game is driven by a linear progression from one story event to the next, usually told via cutscenes, though there are numerous side-quests available that provide bonuses to characters.

Like many traditional role-playing video games, Kingdom Hearts II features an experience point system which determines character development. As enemies are defeated, the player and allies culminate experience to "level up", in which the playable characters grow stronger and gain access to new abilities.

Combat in Kingdom Hearts II is in real-time and involves heavy hack and slash elements with button presses which initiate attacks by the on-screen character. A role-playing game menu on the screen's bottom left, similar to those found in Final Fantasy games, provides other combat options such as using magic or items, summoning beings to assist in battle, or executing combination attacks with other party members. A new feature is the "Reaction Command", special enemy-specific attacks that are triggered when the player presses the triangle button at the correct time during battle. Reaction Commands can be used to defeat regular enemies or avoid damage, and are sometimes necessary to complete a boss battle. In addition to the main character, two party members are usually present who also participate in combat. Although these characters are computer-controlled, the player is allowed to customize their behavior to a certain extent through the menu screen, such as attacking the same enemy Sora targets.

In response to criticism, the "Gummi Ship" feature of the first game was re-imagined to be "more enjoyable". Although retaining its basic purpose of travel, the system was completely redone to resemble a combination of rail shooter and "Disney theme park ride". In the world map, the player must now control the Gummi Ship from a top-down view and fly to the world the player wishes to enter. Worlds are no longer open from the beginning—the player must unlock the routes to them by entering a new level, controlling the ship from a third-person point of view, and battling enemy ships. After the route is opened, travel to the world is unimpeded, unless it is blocked again due to a plot-related event. The player may also gain new Gummi Ships from completing routes, which is also a new feature from the first game.

Drive Gauge
One of the new features is a meter known as the "Drive Gauge". The Drive Gauge has dual functions: to transform Sora into a "Drive Form" or to summon a special character. While in a Drive Form, Sora bonds with party members to become more powerful and acquire different attributes; all but two Forms also allow the use of two Keyblades. When a Drive is executed, Sora's combat statistics are heightened. Drive Forms also give Sora new abilities that can be used in normal form, called "Growth Abilities." Sora's first two Drive Forms only combine power with one party member; later-obtained Drive Forms require him to bond with both party members. When allies are used in a Drive, they are temporarily removed from battle for its duration. Unlike the HP and MP gauges, the Drive Gauge is not refilled at save points.

Like in the first game, Sora can summon a Disney character to aid him in battle. Summons will replace the two computer-controlled characters and fight alongside Sora for as long as the Drive Gauge allows, or until Sora's HP runs out. Instead of being limited to only one action, Summons now have a menu of their own and are capable of performing solo or cooperative actions with Sora. These actions are performed by pressing the triangle button. The Summon ability and each Drive Form are leveled up separately and by different criteria; obtaining higher levels allows for extended use and in the case of Drive Forms, access to new abilities.

Plot

Setting

Kingdom Hearts II begins one year after the events of Kingdom Hearts and Chain of Memories. The game's setting is a collection of various levels (referred to in-game as "worlds") that the player progresses through. As in the first game, the player can travel to various Disney-based locales, along with original worlds specifically created for the series. While Disney-based worlds were primarily derived from the Disney animated features canon in the first game, Kingdom Hearts II introduces worlds that are based on live-action franchise Pirates of the Caribbean as well. Each world varies in appearance and setting, depending on the Disney film on which it is based. The graphics of the world and characters are meant to resemble the artwork style of the environments and characters from their respective Disney films. Each world is disconnected from the others and exists separately; with few exceptions, players travel from one world to another via a Gummi Ship.

Some worlds featured in the previous games reappear, but with new and expanded areas. There are also new worlds that are introduced, including the Land of Dragons (based on Mulan), Beast's Castle (Beauty and the Beast), Timeless River (Steamboat Willie), Port Royal (Pirates of the Caribbean: The Curse of the Black Pearl), Pride Lands (The Lion King), and Space Paranoids (Tron). Twilight Town, an original world first seen in Chain of Memories, has a greater role as the introductory world. The World That Never Was is a new world that serves as the headquarters of Organization XIII.

Characters

The three protagonists of the game are Sora, a 15-year-old boy chosen as a wielder of the Keyblade, a mystical key-shaped weapon that can combat darkness; Donald Duck, the court magician of Disney Castle; and Goofy, the captain of the Disney Castle guards. Both Donald and Goofy are under orders from their missing king, Mickey Mouse, to accompany Sora and his Keyblade. Other original characters include Riku, who is briefly playable at the game's climax, and Kairi, Sora's friends from his home world of Destiny Islands; Roxas, a boy who can also wield the Keyblade and is playable in the game's beginning sequence; Naminé, a girl with the power to manipulate memories; and DiZ, a man in red robes with a vendetta against Organization XIII, who is later revealed to be Ansem the Wise, the mentor of Xehanort.

As in the previous games, there are numerous appearances of characters from both Disney and Square Enix works. While some make a return from Kingdom Hearts, new characters from Disney fiction are also introduced, such as Scar from The Lion King and Scrooge McDuck. Pete appears as a persistent enemy who works with the resurrected Maleficent. Nearly twenty characters from Final Fantasy games appear, notably Auron of Final Fantasy X, Tifa from Final Fantasy VII, and the return of Squall Leonhart, Cloud, and Sephiroth. It was stated that although the first game strictly stuck to characters Tetsuya Nomura designed, this time around they were going to "take some risks", implying that characters not directly designed by Nomura might make an appearance. Other new characters to series are Vivi of Final Fantasy IX, Seifer Almasy of Final Fantasy VIII and Setzer of Final Fantasy VI.

The various worlds that Sora explores often have an optional party character from the film on which the world is based. Such party members include Fa Mulan, the woman who passes as a man in order to take her ailing father's place in the army; Jack Sparrow, a pirate who seeks to reclaim his ship, the Black Pearl; Simba, the self-exiled lion who is the rightful king of the Pride Land; and Tron, a security program in Hollow Bastion's computer network who seeks to end the dictatorship of the Master Control Program.

Organization XIII, a group of powerful Nobodies—the "empty shells" left over when a strong-hearted person becomes a Heartless—introduced in Chain of Memories, is established as the primary group of antagonists early on. Xemnas, the leader of Organization XIII, serves as the main antagonist and final boss of the game. Villains unique to the worlds are still prevalent, and are often presented as challenges that Sora's group must overcome.

Story
Sora, Donald, and Goofy have been in suspended animation for the past year to regain their lost memories. Roxas, Sora's Nobody, is trapped in a virtual simulation of Twilight Town created by DiZ to merge him with his original self to restore Sora's power. DiZ's plans are threatened when Nobodies led by Axel, Roxas's former friend in Organization XIII, infiltrate the virtual town to extract Roxas. However, Roxas is able to repel the Nobodies and finally merge with Sora. Sora, Donald, and Goofy awaken in the real Twilight Town and meet King Mickey and Yen Sid, who send them on another journey; their goal is to find Riku and uncover the Organization's plans. Afterward, Maleficent is resurrected and joins with Pete to continue her quest for power.

Sora travels to familiar and unfamiliar worlds, where he resolves several problems caused by Organization XIII, the Heartless, and various local villains. During a visit to Hollow Bastion, they reunite with Mickey, who explains that the Heartless "Ansem" they defeated is an imposter named Xehanort, whose Nobody, Xemnas, is the Organization's leader. The Organization also reveal that they seek the power of Kingdom Hearts, creating one from the hearts Sora has released from the Heartless with his Keyblade, to regain their lost hearts; in addition, Sora discovers that the Organization is holding Kairi hostage to force him to comply. Sora revisits the worlds to solve lingering problems and new complications while seeking a path to Organization XIII's base of operations in the World That Never Was. Throughout his endeavors, Sora is secretly aided by a hooded figure whom Sora believes to be Riku.

Following a lead, Sora, Donald, and Goofy enter a passageway to the World That Never Was through Twilight Town, where Axel sacrifices himself to give them safe passage. Sora finds Kairi and Riku, the latter of whose appearance has been changed to that of Xehanort's Heartless after using his power to capture Roxas. Mickey encounters DiZ, who reveals himself to be the true Ansem, Xehanort's mentor. Ansem uses a device that dissipates some of Kingdom Hearts' power, but a system overload causes the device to self-destruct, both engulfing Ansem and miraculously returning Riku to his original form. Atop of the Castle That Never Was, Sora and company battle Xemnas, who uses what remains of Kingdom Hearts to fight them. After Sora and Riku destroy Xemnas, the two become trapped in the realm of darkness, where they discover a portal to the realm of light in a bottled letter sent by Kairi, allowing them to return to the Destiny Islands and reunite with their friends. In a post-credits scene, Sora, Kairi, and Riku receive and read a letter from Mickey, the contents of which are hidden from the player.

Development
Development plans for Kingdom Hearts II began around the completion of Kingdom Hearts Final Mix, but specific details were undecided until July 2003. Nomura noted several obstacles to clear before development could begin on a sequel. One such obstacle was the development team's desire to showcase Mickey Mouse more, which required Disney's approval. The game was developed by Square Enix's Product Development Division-1, with most of the original staff from the first game. The game was originally supposed to have been released after Kingdom Hearts. Nomura had planned for the sequel to take place a year after the first and originally intended for the events of that year to be left unexplained. To bridge the gap between the two games, Kingdom Hearts: Chain of Memories was developed. To explain the loss of all the abilities from the first game at the beginning of Kingdom Hearts II, Nomura had Sora's memories scrambled in Kingdom Hearts: Chain of Memories.

Many aspects of the gameplay were reworked for this sequel. Some changes were made due to user feedback and others were meant to be included in previous games but were omitted either because of time or technological constraints. The camera was switched to the right analog stick of the DualShock controller instead of the shoulder buttons and the Gummi Ship travel was reworked. The combat system was completely redone and did not use any animations from the first game. Because Sora had matured, Nomura wanted his fighting style to reflect that. Other changes included more integration between exploration and battles. The variations in combat styles associated with each Drive Form and the introduction of the Reaction Command were added to give players more choices in battles. The inclusion of worlds based on live-action Disney films was aided by technology that generated the character models from live-action pictures.

Audio

Musical score

Like the first game, Kingdom Hearts II features music by Yoko Shimomura and Hikaru Utada. The Original Soundtrack for Kingdom Hearts II was composed by Shimomura and released on January 25, 2006. The opening orchestration and ending credits theme were arranged and orchestrated by Kaoru Wada and performed by the Tokyo Philharmonic Orchestra. The main vocal theme for the original Japanese release was "Passion", written and performed by Utada. The English version of "Passion", "Sanctuary", was used in the Western releases. Utada's involvement was announced on July 29, 2005. According to Nomura, the vocal theme ties in even more closely with the game's story than "Hikari" ("Simple and Clean") did with Kingdom Hearts and Kingdom Hearts: Chain of Memories. The CD single for "Passion" was released on December 14, 2005 and "Sanctuary" was first previewed on MTV's official website in early 2006.

Voice cast
Kingdom Hearts II features well-known voice actors for both the Japanese and English versions. Many of the original voice actors from the first Kingdom Hearts reprised their roles; Miyu Irino and Haley Joel Osment as Sora, Mamoru Miyano and David Gallagher as Riku, and Risa Uchida and Hayden Panettiere as Kairi. New voice actors included Kōki Uchiyama and Jesse McCartney as Roxas, Iku Nakahara and Brittany Snow as Naminé, and Genzō Wakayama and Christopher Lee as DiZ. A special effort was made to preserve the official voice actors from the Disney movies used in Kingdom Hearts II. Many actors reprised their Disney roles for the game, including Ming-Na Wen as Mulan, James Woods as Hades, Bruce Boxleitner as Tron, Chris Sarandon as Jack Skellington and Zach Braff as Chicken Little. Some voice actors from the related television series or direct-to-video sequels were chosen over original voice actors where applicable, such as Robert Costanzo as Philoctetes rather than Danny DeVito or Cam Clarke as Simba instead of Matthew Broderick. Some characters were given new voice actors in the English version; Ansem, Aerith, Leon, Sephiroth and Hercules, who were originally voiced by Billy Zane, Mandy Moore, David Boreanaz, Lance Bass, and Sean Astin respectively in the first game, were voiced by Richard Epcar, Mena Suvari, Doug Erholtz, George Newbern, and Tate Donovan (Hercules' original voice actor), and newcomer Tifa was voiced by Rachael Leigh Cook.

Content editing

Besides English translation and localization, the international version of Kingdom Hearts II differs from the original Japanese version in the content of gameplay and several scenes. The Hydra boss in the Hercules-themed world Olympus Coliseum had its green blood from the original Japanese version (which was taken from the film) changed into black and purple smoke in the English version. In one cutscene, Hercules fights the Hydra and uses his sword on its head, which eventually releases green blood from its mouth in the Japanese version; this was later changed into drool in the English version. There is also a scene in Disney Castle where, after chasing Donald around for missing a date, Daisy Duck pounds him on the backside in the Japanese version, whereas she merely tells him off inaudibly in the English version.

Xigbar's telescopic sight was changed from a crosshair and black shading around the sides to three glowing circles. An attack animation was also altered; in the Japanese version, Xigbar combines his two hand-held guns to create a sniper rifle, which is used to shoot the player's party during the telescoping sight sequence. In the English version, Xigbar does not combine his guns, but twirls them around and shoots at Sora with a single gun.  The death of Organization XIII member Axel was slightly edited; in the original, he bursts into flames during his suicide attack, while in the English version he simply fades away after using up all of his power.

Port Royal, based on Pirates of the Caribbean: The Curse of the Black Pearl, contains the most content edits. Cutscenes were edited to remove some of the violence, such as William Turner threatening to commit suicide while aiming a gun at his neck, as in the film. Unlike the Japanese version, the undead pirates do not catch fire when affected by Fire magic, and their muskets were modified to resemble crossbows, though the crossbows still fire with an audible musket shot sound effect.

Promotion
An unlockable trailer in Kingdom Hearts and Kingdom Hearts Final Mix hinted at the possibility of a sequel. Rumors for a sequel on the PlayStation 2 were spurred in Japan when the video game website Quiter stated that "an internal (and anonymous source) at Square Japan" confirmed that development of Kingdom Hearts II had begun. It was not until Kingdom Hearts II was announced, along with Chain of Memories, at the Tokyo Game Show in September 2003 that rumors were confirmed. Initial details were that it would take place some time after Chain of Memories, which takes place directly after the first game. Other details included the return of Sora, Donald, and Goofy, as well as new costumes. Information about Mickey Mouse's involvement was kept to a minimum.

At the 2004 Square Enix E3 Press conference, producer Shinji Hashimoto said that many mysteries of the first game would be answered. Square Enix launched the official Japanese website in May 2005, followed by the English website in December 2005. The websites featured videos and information regarding characters and worlds. Commercials were aired in Japan which highlighted the numerous Disney characters in the game. Although the game was announced in September 2003, a release date for the game was not set until two years later. Nomura admitted that the game was announced too early and information regarding the game was not released until a debut period was in sight.

Release
Within a week of its Japanese release, Kingdom Hearts II shipped one million copies, selling almost 730,000 copies. The NPD Group reported that Kingdom Hearts II was the highest-selling console game in North America during March 2006 with 614,000 copies. In the month after its release in North America, Kingdom Hearts II sold an estimated one million copies. GameStop listed the game as their best-selling title for the first quarter of 2006. The game was also on IGN's "Top 10 Sellers in 2006". By December 2006, over 3.5 million copies of Kingdom Hearts II had been shipped worldwide with 700,000 in PAL regions, 1.1 million in Japan, and 1.7 million in North America. By March 31, 2007, Square Enix had shipped over 4 million units worldwide.

Reception

Kingdom Hearts II received critical acclaim upon release, garnering positive reviews. The game received numerous awards and high ratings among reviews including a Satellite Award in 2006 for "Outstanding Game Based on Existing Medium". It tied with Resident Evil 4 as Famitsus "Game of the Year" 2005. Famitsus readers ranked the game 29th on their "All Time Top 100" feature, ten places below Kingdom Hearts. It was ranked number one on IGN's 2006 "Reader's Choice" for PlayStation 2 games. Eurogamer ranked it 34th on their "Top 50 Games of 2006" list. Video game magazine Electronic Gaming Monthly awarded it "Best Sequel" of 2006, and Game Informer listed it among the "Top 50 games of 2006". VideoGamer.com featured it 10th in their article "Top 10: Role playing games". GamePro named it the 25th best RPG title of all time. Kingdom Hearts II also received a near-perfect score, 39/40, from the Japanese gaming magazine Famitsu.

Critics commended many aspects of the game. GameSpy praised the quality of the voice acting and cited the graphics as "on par with the best of Square's productions to date." They also commented on the realistic and accurate character models for the characters from Pirates of the Caribbean. IGN rated the graphics a 9/10 and stated that the "worlds look very much like their filmed counterparts." Japanese gaming site Gpara.com also praised the look of the worlds. G4 awarded Kingdom Hearts II "Best Voice Over" and "Best Soundtrack" in their 2006 G-Phoria awards show.

Like its predecessors, the gameplay received mixed reviews. Many compliments were directed at the new camera controls and combat interactions between party members. GamePro stated that the beginning was "sluggishly slow", but praised the action-oriented combat. GameSpot said that the fixed camera system and new gameplay dynamics improved the experience, but they felt the game was far too easy and that there was too much button-mashing. IGN also commented on the button-mashing aspect of the gameplay and criticized the party member's artificial intelligence, citing it as "absolutely terrible", but praised the story, presentation, and new battle features. Gpara.com had positive comments about the ease of combo attacks and complimented the steady pacing of the story and gameplay.
Criticism towards the "button-mashing" and easy gameplay is often reconsidered by western players thanks to the "Critical Mode" difficulty option, previously available only in the Japan exclusive Final Mix version but now present in every subsequent re-release

The game was ranked the 16th greatest console video game of all time in a 2021 Japanese poll conducted by TV Asahi which surveyed over 50,000 respondents.

Versions and merchandise

Kingdom Hearts II has been released in four different versions. The first three are the normal regional releases in Japan, North America, and PAL regions, which only differ nominally in content editing and localization. The European and Australian PAL releases were reformatted to run at 50 Hz to fit the definition size of PAL encoding systems. The fourth version has additional content and was released under the title Kingdom Hearts II Final Mix. Like the previous titles, both Square and Disney released numerous types of merchandise before and after the game came out. Merchandise ranged from toys and figurines to clothing items and books. The game has also been adapted into both manga and novel series. Prior to the game's release, an Ultimania book titled Kingdom Hearts Series Ultimania α ~Introduction of Kingdom Hearts II~ came out. It provides extended information on the first two Kingdom Hearts games, as well as information on the unreleased Kingdom Hearts II. After the release of the game, Kingdom Hearts II Ultimania, which focuses on the game itself, came out. Another book, titled Kingdom Hearts II Final Mix+ Ultimania, was released after the Final Mix version came out. Released along with Final Mix, Kingdom Hearts -Another Report- was a hardback book which includes game information, visuals by Shiro Amano, and a director interview. In North America, BradyGames published two strategy guides—a standard guide and a limited edition version. The latter version was available in four different covers and included a copy of Jiminy's Journal along with 400 stickers.

Final Mix
Because the first game was re-released, there was speculation whether Tetsuya Nomura would do the same with Kingdom Hearts II. In a Weekly Shōnen Jump interview with Nomura, he expressed interest in a possible international version of Kingdom Hearts II, although there were no definite plans. He said that should a "Final Mix" version arise, he had a "trump card" in mind, with such features as the Mushroom Heartless found in the first Kingdom Hearts game. In September 2006, Square Enix announced Kingdom Hearts II Final Mix, featuring new scenes and gameplay elements. Like the first re-release, this version would combine English audio with Japanese text and also use the "Sanctuary" theme song instead of "Passion". New cutscenes, however, used Japanese voice acting, as they mostly featured Organization XIII members from Kingdom Hearts: Chain of Memories who did not yet have English voice actors; these scenes were later re-dubbed into English for the HD 2.5 Remix release.

Kingdom Hearts II was re-released in Japan on March 29, 2007 as a 2-disc set titled Kingdom Hearts II Final Mix+. The first disc contains Kingdom Hearts II Final Mix with a new secret movie and additional battles and items. The second disc contains Kingdom Hearts Re:Chain of Memories, a 3D PlayStation 2 remake of Kingdom Hearts: Chain of Memories with extra scenes and voice acting. The battle system maintains the card gameplay, with the addition of Reaction Commands from Kingdom Hearts II. Like the first game's Final Mix, the two games serve as a canonical update to the series. The book Kingdom Hearts -Another Report- was included along with the game for those who reserved a copy. Based on Amazon.com figures, Final Mix+ was the number one PlayStation 2 game in sales during the week of its release in Japan. Nomura cited the presence of Kingdom Hearts Re:Chain of Memories to explain why Kingdom Hearts II Final Mix+ was so popular. Nevertheless, in a Famitsu poll in July 2011, Kingdom Hearts II Final Mix was voted the most popular entry so far.

It was released for the first time outside Japan as part of Kingdom Hearts HD 2.5 Remix.

Printed adaptations
A manga series based on the game started its serialization in the June 2006 issue of the magazine Monthly Shōnen Gangan, published by Square Enix. The artist is Shiro Amano, who also did the Kingdom Hearts and Chain of Memories manga series. The first volume was released in Japan in December 2006. As a result of Amano working in the Kingdom Hearts 358/2 Days manga, the series has been on hiatus and resumed publication in October 2012. Tokyopop licensed the manga and released volume one in North America on July 3, 2007. The second volume was released the following year.

The game has also been novelized by Tomoco Kanemaki and illustrated by Shiro Amano. The first volume, titled "Roxas—Seven Days", was released on April 22, 2006 and covers Roxas' story to when Sora wakes up and leaves Twilight Town. The novel depicts extra scenes that were added in the Final Mix version, such as interaction between Organization XIII members and between Axel, Naminé and Riku. The second book, "The Destruction of Hollow Bastion", was released on July 16, 2006, the third book, "Tears of Nobody," revolving around Roxas' past, was released on September 29, 2006, and the fourth book, "Anthem—Meet Again/Axel Last Stand," came out in February 2007.

HD 2.5 Remix

In the credits of HD 1.5 Remix, clips of Kingdom Hearts II Final Mix were shown, hinting at its inclusion in another collection. On October 14, 2013, Square Enix announced Kingdom Hearts HD 2.5 Remix, a second compilation exclusively for the PlayStation 3 after HD 1.5 Remix, that includes both Kingdom Hearts II Final Mix and Kingdom Hearts Birth by Sleep Final Mix in HD and trophy support. Additionally, the collection includes HD cinematic scenes from Kingdom Hearts Re:coded and was released in Japan on October 2, 2014, North America on December 2, 2014, Australia on December 4, 2014, and Europe on December 5, 2014.

See also
 List of Disney video games

Notes

References
Citations

External links

 Kingdom Hearts II official website 
 Kingdom Hearts II Final Mix+ official website 
 

2005 video games
Abandoned buildings and structures in fiction
Action role-playing video games
Crossover role-playing video games
Disney video games
Japanese role-playing video games
Kingdom Hearts
Mickey Mouse video games
Pirates of the Caribbean video games
PlayStation 2 games
PlayStation 2-only games
Single-player video games
Square Enix games
Theft in fiction
Video game sequels
Video games scored by Yoko Shimomura
Video games developed in Japan
Video games set in Africa
Video games set in China
Video games set in France
Video games set in Greece
Video games set in Jamaica
Video games set in the Middle East
Video games directed by Tetsuya Nomura
Video games with alternative versions
Video games with alternate endings